Pilistvere is a village in Põhja-Sakala Parish, Viljandi County, in central Estonia. Pilistvere lies on the left bank of the Navesti River. As of 2011 census, the settlement's population was 90.

Pilistvere Church
The church, originally dedicated to St. Andrew, dates from the end of the 13th century. It is a hall church with a nave and two aisles. The church has a square choir and a western tower. Of the original medieval furnishings, little remains as the church has been damaged by fire and war on several occasions. The baroque pulpit (1686) is the most noteworthy interior furnishing. The tower has the tallest spire of any rural church in Estonia.

Gallery

References

Villages in Viljandi County
Põhja-Sakala Parish
Kreis Fellin